Gade may refer to:

 Gade (surname)
 Gadê County, in Qinghai, China
 River Gade, in southern England
"Gade", a song by Croatian singer Severina Vučković
 Gade language, a language of Nigeria

See also
Gades (disambiguation)